Mezensky (masculine), Mezenskaya (feminine), or Mezenskoye (neuter) is the name of several rural localities in Russia:
Mezensky (rural locality), a settlement in Pakhomovsky Selsoviet of Orlovsky District of Oryol Oblast
Mezenskoye (rural locality), a selo under the administrative jurisdiction of the Town of Zarechny in Sverdlovsk Oblast